Chiclete com Banana (Portuguese for "chewing gum with banana") is an Axé music band, currently consisting of Bell Marques, Wadinho Marques, Rey, Waltinho Cruz, Deny and Lelo. 
The group is named after the very well known and influential song "Chiclete com Banana", written by Gordurinha (Waldeck Artur Macedo; 1922–1969) and Almira Castilho, which was first recorded in 1959 by Brazilian popstar Jackson do Pandeiro and by dozens of performers, including Gilberto Gil.   

Chiclete com Banana released its first album, called Estação Das Cores (1983) and Traz os montes, in 1983, and is regarded as one of the most successful bands of the Axé music genre in Brazil. Chiclete rose to fame in Bahia in the 1980s like other axé bands and artists (among them the famous Ivete Sangalo). Today, Chiclete is one of the most popular and expensive micaretas during Carnaval in Bahia, although they perform throughout Brazil all year. Their performance can cost R$400.000 for 2.5 hours of show (about $100,000 USD) or more during Carnaval  in Salvador. They usually have anywhere from 200,000 to 500,000 people walking along their sound truck (or Trio Elétrico ). This is divided in about 5,000 – 10,000 people inside the "ropes" who bought the abadás, special shirts that everyone wears. The band has its own Trio Elétrico  named Tyrannosaurus Rex 2000-2009 and Rex Skydome 2010-2013.

Discography

 Estação Das Cores (1983)
 Traz Os Montes (1983)
 Energia (1984)
 Sementes (1985)
 Fissura (1986)
 Gritos De Guerra (1987)
 Fé Brasileira (1988)
 Tambores Urbanos (1989)
 Toda Mistura Será Permitida (1990)
 Jambo (1991)
 Classificados (1992)
 Chiclete Com Banana (1993)
 13 (1994)
 Banana Coral (1995)
 Menina Dos Olhos (1996)
 Para Ti (1997)
 É Festa (Ao Vivo) (1997)
 Bem Me Quer (1998)
 Borboleta Azul (1999)
 São João De Rua (2000)
 Chiclete (2000)
 Santo Protetor (2001)
 Chiclete Na Caixa Banana No Cacho (Ao Vivo) (2003)
 Sou Chicleteiro (2004)
 Chiclete na Ponta da Lingua (2005)

External links
  Official site

Brazilian musical groups